Taa , also known as ǃXóõ  (also spelled ǃKhong and ǃXoon), is a Tuu language notable for its large number of phonemes, perhaps the largest in the world. It is also notable for having perhaps the heaviest functional load of click consonants, with one count finding that 82% of basic vocabulary items started with a click. Most speakers live in Botswana, but a few hundred live in Namibia. The people call themselves ǃXoon (pl. ǃXooŋake) or ʼNǀohan (pl. Nǀumde), depending on the dialect they speak. The Tuu languages are one of the three traditional language families that make up the Khoisan languages.

(ǃXóõ) is an ethnonym used at opposite ends of the Taa-speaking area, but not by Taa speakers in between. Most living Taa speakers are ethnic ǃXoon (plural ) or 'Nǀohan (plural ).

Taa shares a number of characteristic features with West ǂʼAmkoe and Gǀui, which together are considered part of the Kalahari Basin sprachbund.

Classification
Until the rediscovery of a few elderly speakers of Nǁng in the 1990s, Taa was thought to be the last surviving member of the Tuu language family.

Dialects

There is sufficient dialectal variation in Taa that it might be better described as a dialect continuum than a single language. Taa dialects fall into two groups, suggesting a historical spread from west to east:

West Taa: Anthony Traill's West ǃXoon and Dorothea Bleek's Nǀuǁʼen
East Taa
ǃAma (Western)
(Eastern)
East ǃXoon (Lone Tree)
Tsaasi–ǂHuan
Tsaasi
ǂHuan

Traill worked primarily with East ǃXoon, and the DoBeS project is working with ʼNǀohan (in East Taa) and West ǃXoon.

ǀʼAuni and Kiǀhazi, previously considered dialects of Taa, were more divergent than the dialects here, and are now classified as a distinct language, Lower Nossob.

Alternate names
The various dialects and social groups of the Taa, their many names, the unreliability of transcriptions found in the literature, and the fact that names may be shared between languages and that dialects have been classified, has resulted in a great deal of confusion.  Traill (1974), for example, spent two chapters of his Compleat Guide to the Koon [sic] disentangling names and dialects.

The name ǃXoon (more precisely ǃXóõ) is only used at Aminius Reserve in Namibia, around Lone Tree where Traill primarily worked, and at Dzutshwa (Botswana).  It is, however, used by the ǃXoon for all Taa speakers.  It has been variously spelled ǃxō, ǃkɔ̃ː, ǃko/ǃkõ, Khong, and the fully anglicized Koon.

Bleek's Nǀuǁʼen dialect has been spelled ǀNuǁen, ǀNuǁe꞉n, Ngǀuǁen, Nguen, Nǀhuǁéi, ŋǀuǁẽin, ŋǀuǁẽi, ŋǀuǁen, ǀuǁen.  It has also been called by the ambiguous Khoekhoe term Nǀusan (Nǀu-san, Nǀūsā, Nǀuusaa, Nǀhusi), sometimes rendered Nusan or Noosan, which has been used for other languages in the area.  A subgroup was known as Koon .  This dialect is apparently extinct.

Westphal studied ǂHuan (ǂhũa) dialect (or ǂHũa-ʘwani), and used this name for the entire language.  However, the term is ambiguous between Taa (Western ǂHũa) and ǂʼAmkoe (Eastern ǂHũa), and for this reason Traill chose to call the language ǃXóõ.

Tsaasi dialect is quite similar to ǂHuan, and like ǂHuan, the name is used ambiguously for a dialect of ǂʼAmkoe. This is a Tswana name, variously rendered Tshasi, Tshase, Tʃase, Tsase, Sasi, and Sase.

The Tswana term for Bushmen, Masarwa, is frequently encountered.  More specific to the Taa are Magon (Magong) and the Tshasi mentioned above.

The Taa distinguish themselves along at least some of the groups above. Like many San peoples, they also distinguish themselves by the environment they live in (plain people, river people, etc.), and also by direction.  Traill reports the following:

 "westerners"
 "southerners"
 "in-betweeners"
 "pure people"

Heinz reports that  is an exonym given by other Bushmen, and that the Taa call themselves .

The Taa refer to their language as  "people's language". Westphal (1971) adopted the word  "person" as the name for the Southern Khoisan language family, which is now called Tuu. The East ǃXoon term for the language is ǃxóɲa ǂâã .

Phonology

Taa has at least 58 consonants, 31 vowels, and four tones (Traill 1985, 1994 on East ǃXoon), or at least 87 consonants, 20 vowels, and two tones (DoBeS 2008 on West ǃXoon), by many counts the most of any known language if non-oral vowel qualities are counted as different from corresponding oral vowels. These include 20 (Traill) or 43 (DoBeS) click consonants and several vowel phonations, though opinions vary as to which of the 130 (Traill) or 164 (DoBeS) consonant sounds are single segments and which are consonant clusters.

Tones
Anthony Traill describes four tones for the East ǃXoon dialect: high , mid , low , and mid-falling . Patterns for bisyllabic bases include high-high, mid-mid, mid-mid-falling, and low-low. DoBeS describes only two tonemes, high and low, for the West ǃXoon dialect. By analyzing each base as bimoraic, Traill's four tones are mapped onto [áá], [àá], [àà], and [áà]. Unlike Traill, Naumann does not find a four-way contrast on monomoraic grammatical forms in Eastern ǃXoõ data.

In addition to lexical tone, Traill describes East ǃXoon nouns as falling into two tone classes according to the melody induced on concordial morphemes and transitive verbs: either level (Tone Class I) or falling (Tone Class II). Transitive object nouns from Tone Class I trigger mid/mid-rising tone in transitive verbs, while Tone Class 2 objects correlate with any tone contour. Naumann finds the same results in the eastern ʼNǀohan dialect.

Vowels
Taa has five vowel qualities, . The Traill and DoBeS descriptions differ in the phonations of these vowels; it's not clear if this reflects a dialectal difference or a difference of analysis.

East ǃXoon (Traill)
Traill describes the phonations of the East ǃXoon dialect as plain , murmured , or glottalized .  may also be both glottalized and murmured , as well as pharyngealized / or strident ('sphincteric') /.  may be both pharyngealized and glottalized , for 26 vowels not counting nasalization or length.

Murmured vowels after plain consonants contrast with plain vowels after aspirated consonants, and likewise glottalized vowels with ejective consonants, so these are phonations of the vowels and not assimilation with consonant phonation.

Vowels may be long or short, but long vowels may be sequences rather than distinct phonemes.

All plain vowels may be nasalized. No other phonation may be nasalized, but nasalization occurs in combination with other phonations as the second vowel of a sequence ("long vowel" or "diphthong"). These sequences alternate dialectally with vowel plus velar nasal. That is, the name ǃXóõ may be dialectally , and this in turn may be phonemically , since  does not occur word-finally. However, this cannot explain the short nasal vowels, so Taa has at least 31 vowels.

A long, glottalized, murmured, nasalized o with falling tone is written . A long, strident nasalized o with low tone is written , since Traill analyzes stridency as phonemically pharyngealized murmur. (Note that phonetically these are distinct phonations.)

West ǃXoon (DoBeS)
DoBeS describes the phonations of the West ǃXoon dialect as plain, a e i o u; nasalized, an en in on un; epiglottalized or pharyngealized, aq eq iq oq uq; strident, aqh eqh iqh oqh uqh; and glottalized or 'tense', aʼ eʼ iʼ oʼ uʼ.

Consonants
Taa is unusual in allowing mixed voicing in its consonants. These have been analyzed as prevoiced, but also as consonant clusters. When homorganic, as in [dt], such clusters are listed in the chart below.

Taa consonants are complex, and it is not clear how much of the difference between the dialects is real and how much is an artifact of analysis.

East ǃXoon (Traill)

Consonants in parentheses are rare. 

Taa is typologically unusual in having mixed-voice ejectives.

Taa may have as few as 83 click sounds, if the more complex clicks are analyzed as clusters. Given the intricate clusters posited seen in the non-click consonants, it is not surprising that many of the Taa clicks should be analyzed as clusters. However, there is some debate whether these are actually clusters; all non-Khoisan languages in the world that have clusters allow clusters with sonorants like r, l, w, j (as in English tree, sleep, quick, cue), and this does not occur in Taa.

There are five click articulations: bilabial, dental, lateral, alveolar, and palatal. There are nineteen series, differing in phonation, manner, and complexity (see airstream contour). These are perfectly normal consonants in Taa, and indeed are preferred over non-clicks in word-initial position.

Work on Taa's sister language Nǁng suggests that all clicks in both languages have a uvular or rear articulation, and that the clicks considered to be uvular here are actually lingual–pulmonic and lingual–glottalic airstream contours. It may be that the 'prevoiced' consonants of Taa, including prevoiced clicks, can also be analyzed as contour consonants, in this case with voicing contours.

* DoBeS only matches 17 series to Traill, as the – and – distinctions he discovered had not yet been published.

Traill's account of East ǃXoon leaves for voiceless series of clicks without equivalents with a voiced lead. The DoBeS account of West ǃXoon, which uses voicing for morphological derivation to a greater extent than East ǃXoon does, has four additional series, written nꞰʼʼ, gꞰʼ, gꞰqʼ and nꞰhh in their practical orthography. The first three match the unpaired glottalized series of Traill,  (= ), . If Traill's  series is the voiced equivalent of plain aspirated , rather than delayed aspirated, that would leave the DobeS nꞰhh series as voiced delayed aspiration.

All nasal clicks have twin airstreams, since the air passing through the nose bypasses the tongue. Usually this is pulmonic egressive. However, the  series in Taa is characterized by pulmonic ingressive nasal airflow. Ladefoged & Maddieson (1996:268) state that "This ǃXóõ click is probably unique among the sounds of the world's languages that, even in the middle of a sentence, it may have ingressive pulmonic airflow." Taa is the only language known to contrast voiceless nasal and voiceless nasal aspirated (i.e. delayed aspirated) clicks (Miller 2011).

West ǃXoon (DoBeS)
West ǃXoon has 164 consonants in a strict unit analysis, including 111 clicks in 23 series, which under a cluster analysis reduce to 87 consonants, including 43 clicks.

These are written in the practical orthography (Naumann 2008).<ref>

References

Anthony Traill (2018). A Trilingual ǃXóõ Dictionary. ǃXóõ–English–Setswana. Ed. Hirosi Nakagawa & Anderson Chebanne. (Research in Khoisan Studies, 37.) Cologne: Rüdiger Köppe.

External links

 DoBeS Taa language project
 Large collection of ǃXóõ words on Wiktionary
 Swadesh list for ǃXóõ
 UCLA Archive for ǃXóõ, includes story and language sound files
 Taa basic lexicon at the Global Lexicostatistical Database

Tuu languages
Languages of Botswana
Languages of Namibia